Kendriya Vidyalaya Shivpuri (Hindi for Central School, shivpuri) is a school of  Kendriya Vidyalaya Sangathan, under the Ministry of Human Resource Development, India.

Location

This school is located on Agra-Mumbai highway, 2 km from a Shivpuri bus stand near Jhansi road.

History

This school was created to educate the children of soldiers serving in the Campus of ITBP. The school was taken over from ITBP by KVS and inducted on 26 September 1988. It started in a temporary building. on the ITBP. Vidyalaya moved to a new building in September 2003. The first cohort of Class X appeared in "Board's Examination", in 1988 and the first cohort of class-XII (Sc.)  in 1991. Vidyalay introduced an Arts Stream in 1992-93. The first cohort of XII (Arts) left in 1994 due to insufficient students. Arts Stream closed in 2001.

References

Kendriya Vidyalayas
Shivpuri district
Schools in Madhya Pradesh
Central Board of Secondary Education